Tourist Bungalow is a 1975 Indian Malayalam film,  directed by A. B. Raj. The film stars Prem Nazir, Jayabharathi, Kaviyoor Ponnamma and Adoor Bhasi in the lead roles. The film has musical score by M. K. Arjunan.

Cast

Prem Nazir
Jayabharathi
Kaviyoor Ponnamma
Adoor Bhasi
Bahadoor
M. G. Soman
N. Govindankutty
Vincent

Soundtrack
The music was composed by M. K. Arjunan and the lyrics were written by O. N. V. Kurup.

References

External links
 

1975 films
1970s Malayalam-language films